Monte Sereno (Spanish for "Serene Mountain") is a city in Santa Clara County, California, United States. The population was 3,479 at the 2020 census. The city is named for the  El Sereno Mountain, upon the slopes of which the southern portion of the city is built. The community is entirely residential with no commercial zoning and 99% single-family housing. It is an upscale Silicon Valley bedroom community. Monte Sereno shares the 95030 ZIP code with the town of Los Gatos. Many municipal services are provided under contract by Los Gatos.

History 
The Monte Sereno area was part of the 1839 Alta California land grant of Rancho Rinconada de Los Gatos. The city incorporated on May 14, 1957, to protect its semi-rural atmosphere. Its first Mayor was Retired Vice Admiral and former U.S. Director of Naval Intelligence, Thomas B. Inglis.

John Steinbeck wrote The Grapes of Wrath and Of Mice and Men in a wooded home at 16250 Greenwood Lane in what is now Monte Sereno.

Beat generation figure Neal Cassady lived in a Monte Sereno ranch house in the 1950s. Painter Thomas Kinkade lived in Monte Sereno in the later years of his life and until his death.

Geography

Saratoga-Los Gatos Road (State Route 9) runs through the city.

The El Sereno Open Space Preserve is immediately south of the city and covers the top and portions of the flanks of El Sereno mountain.

Demographics

2010
The 2010 United States Census reported that Monte Sereno had a population of 3,341. The racial makeup of Monte Sereno was 2,698 (80.8%) White, 14 (0.4%) African American, 12 (0.4%) Native American, 464 (13.9%) Asian, 0 (0.0%) Pacific Islander, 28 (0.8%) from other races, and 125 (3.7%) from two or more races. Hispanic or Latino of any race were 162 persons (4.8%).

The Census reported that 100% of the population lived in households.

There were 1,211 households, out of which 433 (35.8%) had children under the age of 18 living in them, 917 (75.7%) were opposite-sex married couples living together, 59 (4.9%) had a female householder with no husband present, 26 (2.1%) had a male householder with no wife present. There were 14 (1.2%) unmarried opposite-sex partnerships, and 8 (0.7%) same-sex married couples or partnerships. 178 households (14.7%) were made up of individuals, and 87 (7.2%) had someone living alone who was 65 years of age or older. The average household size was 2.76. There were 1,002 families (82.7% of all households); the average family size was 3.05.

The population was spread out, with 816 people (24.4%) under the age of 18, 156 people (4.7%) aged 18 to 24, 487 people (14.6%) aged 25 to 44, 1,235 people (37.0%) aged 45 to 64, and 647 people (19.4%) who were 65 years of age or older. The median age was 48.3 years. For every 100 females, there were 96.3 males. For every 100 females age 18 and over, there were 94.2 males.

The homeowner vacancy rate was 1.3%; the rental vacancy rate was 5.4%. 3,030 people (90.7% of the population) lived in owner-occupied housing units and 311 people (9.3%) lived in rental housing units.

2000
As of the census of 2000, there were 3,483 people, 1,211 households, and 1,024 families residing in the city. The racial makeup of the city was 83.61% White, 0.17% African American, 0.06% Native American, 12.29% Asian, 0.03% Pacific Islander, 1.06% from other races, and 2.78% from two or more races. Hispanic or Latino of any race were 3.59% of the population. In the city 604 people are foreign born, 6.7% from Asia, 3% from Europe, and 2.7% from other North American countries.

There were 1,211 households, out of which 39.1% had children under the age of 18 living with them, 78.0% were married couples living together, 4.0% had a female householder with no husband present, and 15.4% were non-families. 12.6% of all households were made up of individuals, and 5.9% had someone living alone who was 65 years of age or older. The average household size was 2.88 and the average family size was 3.13.

In the city, the population was spread out, with 27.8% under the age of 18, 3.7% from 18 to 24, 21.8% from 25 to 44, 32.2% from 45 to 64, and 14.5% who were 65 years of age or older. The median age was 43 years. For every 100 females, there were 99.9 males. For every 100 females age 18 and over, there were 96.6 males.

The median income for a household in the city was $154,268, and the median income for a family was $156,706. The unemployment rate in 2015 was 3.7%. Males had a median income of $100,000+ versus $41,875 for females. The per capita income for the city was $76,577. About 3.1% of families and 4.2% of the population were below the poverty line, including 3.9% of those under age 18 and 4.8% of those age 65 or over.

Politics
Of Monte Sereno's 2,687 registered voters, 43% are registered Democrats while 26% are registered Republicans, according to a January 2022 report by the California Secretary of State.

In the state legislature, Monte Sereno is in the 15th Senate District, represented by Democrat Dave Cortese, and in the 28th Assembly District, represented by Democrat Evan Low.

Monte Sereno is also served by District 1 Santa Clara County Supervisor Mike Wasserman.

Schools 
Most of Monte Sereno's residents are served by the Los Gatos Union Elementary School or Saratoga Elementary School districts (for elementary and middle schools) and Los Gatos-Saratoga Union High School Districts (for high school). A small portion of residents, primarily in the Bicknell Road area, are served by the Campbell Union School and the Campbell Union High School districts.

Public services
Public services for Monte Sereno are served by those of the town of Los Gatos. These include the Los Gatos-Monte Sereno Police Department, the Los Gatos Parks and Recreation Department, and Los Gatos youth sports leagues.

Government 
Monte Sereno is a General Law City incorporated on May 14, 1957. It operates under the City Council-City Manager form of local government, which combines the political leadership of a five-member elected City Council with the strong professional experience of an appointed local government administrator (City Manager) who is responsible for the day-to-day administrative operation of the city, including preparation of the budget, delivery of services, hiring of personnel, and implementation of capital projects.

City Council elections are held the first Tuesday of November in even-numbered years. The election is nonpartisan, and the councilmembers are elected "at large" to serve the entire community rather than by district. The councilmembers are elected to four-year terms. In 1998, voters approved an ordinance limiting the number of terms a member of the Monte Sereno City Council may serve on the City Council to two consecutive four-year terms with a right to hold office again only after at least two years have elapsed since that person last held office.

In 2004, the City Council voted to cancel the election because only the two incumbents whose terms were up, Erin Garner and David Baxter, filed candidacy papers to run for the two available seats. However, in 2008, the City Council voted to hold the election for the two available seats despite there being only two candidates, Lana Malloy and Susan Garner.

(1) Javed Ellahie, Burton Craig, and Evert Wolsheimer were appointed to the council rather than holding an election in November 2022 because they were the only three residents who submitted candidacy forms for the three open council seats.
(2) Council Member LaBouve resigned on September 1, 2020.
(3) On March 5, 2019, Council Members Turner, Leuthold and Lawler voted to strip Mayor Rogers of his title of Mayor and elevate Vice Mayor Turner to Mayor and make Council Member Lawler the Vice Mayor.
(4) Daniel LaBouve was appointed on May 7, 2019 to fill Curtis Rogers' seat after Mr. Rogers resigned on March 5, 2019.
(5) Evert Wolsheimer was appointed on November 3, 2015 to fill Susan Garner's seat.
(6) Lon Allan was appointed January 21, 2014 to fill Julie Wiltshire's seat.
(7) Julie Wiltshire resigned in December 2013 when she moved out of the city.
(8) Marshall Anstandig was appointed November 18, 2008 to fill Alan Aerts' seat after Mr. Aerts resigned on October 21, 2008 for health reasons.
(9) Appointed April 13, 2000 to fill Joel Gambord's seat when Mr. Gambord moved out of the city.

Notable events

Christmas decorations
A dispute between two neighbors over extravagant Christmas decorations gained Monte Sereno attention in national news. For years, Bonnie and Alan Aerts of Monte Sereno had showcased elaborate holiday displays in their front yard, costing as much as US$150,000. The displays attracted large masses of visitors, resulting in great traffic around the normally quiet cul-de-sac of four houses. Neighbors Le and Susan Nguyen protested, and, in late 2003, the city council voted 3-2 (Nesbet, Brodsky, Wright for; Garner, Baxter against) to pass an ordinance regarding "regulation of special events,"   which would require permits for such displays. In 2004, on the first Christmas season for which the law was effective, the Aertses declined to apply for a permit, which would allow the Aertses' holiday display to be active only for 12 hours in a 72-hour period and would require a 30-day waiting period before a new 72-hour permit could be applied for. Instead, they erected a huge, 10-foot-tall Grinch on their lawn, who swayed from side while singing "You're a Mean One, Mr. Grinch". The Grinch's outstretched arm pointed conspicuously at the home of the Nguyens. 

The spectacle gained mention from the Associated Press and NPR. The Aertses and the Nguyens also appeared on Jimmy Kimmel Live!, a late night talk show.

Padgett lawsuit
Darla and Joe Padgett and the City of Monte Sereno litigated in various lawsuits stemming out of incidents relating to the Padgett's building of a home which was started in 1999. The City began with allegations of code violations, including a wooden fence that was too tall. Later, the Padgetts claimed, and later proved, that a city employee had written them a threatening letter and that there had been numerous other attempts made to intimidate them. In September 2007, Monte Sereno's city manager, Brian Loventhal, was found to have destroyed evidence. In June 2009, a jury found that Mayor Curtis Wright violated the couple's civil rights and awarded the Padgetts $1 in compensatory damages, $200,000 in punitive damages, and awarded $600,000 in attorney's fees and costs.   In 2010, the punitive damages were reduced from $200,000 to $10,000.

City in Turmoil in 2019
In February 2019, newly elected Council Member Shawn Leuthold successfully led an effort to change how Monte Sereno would select its mayor in the future, arguing that the City was violating the law in election years by choosing the Mayor for the next year, prior to the seating of the newly-elected council members. In March 2019, the Council went a step further and removed Mayor Curtis Rogers from his position as mayor, and then appointed the then-current Vice Mayor Rowena Turner as Mayor with Council Member Liz Lawler being appointed as Vice Mayor (with Council Members Turner, Lawler, and Leuthold voting for the changes and Council Members Javed Ellahie and Rogers voting against). Upon being removed as Mayor, Council Member Rogers resigned. The Council appointed Daniel LaBouve to fill the vacancy. During the course of the remainder of the year, most of the City staff resigned: Finance Officer Sue L’Heureux, City Attorney Kirsten Powell, Building Official Rob Queirolo, and City Manager Terry Blount. The City staff also decided to unionize for the first time in Monte Sereno's 60-year history. In April 2020, Andrea Chelemengos, City Clerk for the prior two decades, resigned.

Notable people

References

External links
 City of Monte Sereno official website
 Map of El Sereno Open Space Preserve
 Photos from El Sereno Open Space Preserve
 

Cities in Santa Clara County, California
Cities in the San Francisco Bay Area
Incorporated cities and towns in California
Silicon Valley